Laurino is a surname. Notable people with the surname include:

Felipe Laurino (born 1989), Uruguayan soccer player
Margaret Laurino (born 1952), American politician
Maria Laurino (born 1959), American journalist, essayist, memoirist, and former political speechwriter
William Laurino (born 1941), American politician